In combinatorial mathematics, an Aztec diamond of order n consists of all squares of a square lattice whose centers (x,y) satisfy |x| + |y| ≤ n. Here n is a fixed integer, and the square lattice consists of unit squares with the origin as a vertex of 4 of them, so that both x and y are half-integers.

The Aztec diamond theorem states that the number of domino tilings of the Aztec diamond of order n is 2n(n+1)/2. The Arctic Circle theorem says that a random tiling of a large Aztec diamond tends to be frozen outside a certain circle.

It is common to color the tiles in the following fashion. First consider a checkerboard coloring
of the diamond. Each tile will cover exactly one black square. Vertical tiles where the top square covers a black square,
is colored in one color, and the other vertical tiles in a second. Similarly for horizontal tiles.

Knuth has also defined Aztec diamonds of order n + 1/2. They are identical with the polyominoes associated with the centered square numbers.

Non-intersecting paths 
Something that is very useful for counting tilings is looking at the non-intersecting paths through its corresponding directed graph. If we define our movements through a tiling (domino tiling) to be
 (1,1) when we are the bottom of a vertical tiling
 (1,0) where we are the end of a horizontal tiling
 (1,-1) when we are at the top of a vertical tiling
Then through any tiling we can have these paths from our sources to our sinks. These movements are similar to Schröder paths.

The number of tilings for order 2 is

det

According to Lindstrom-Gessel-Viennot, if we let S be the set of all our sources and T be the set of all our sinks of our directed graph then

detnumber of non-intersecting paths from S to T.

Considering the directed graph of the Aztec Diamond, it has also been shown by Eu and Fu that Schröder paths and the tilings of the Aztec diamond are in bijection. Hence, finding the determinant of the path matrix, will give us the number of tilings for the Aztec Diamond of order n.

Another way to determine the number of tilings of an Aztec Diamond is using Hankel matrices of large and small Schröder numbers, using the method from Lindstrom-Gessel-Viennot again. Finding the determinant of these matrices gives us the number of non-intersecting paths of small and large Schröder numbers, which is in bijection with the tilings.

and

Other tiling problems 
Consider the shape,  block, and we can ask the same question as for the Aztec Diamond of order n. As this has been proven in many papers, we will refer to.

The number of tilings of 

It is understood that  is a  shape that can only be tiled 1 way, no ways. Using induction, consider  and that is just  domino tile where there is only  tiling. Focusing on how we can begin our tiling, we have two cases. The other way we can start our tiling is by laying two horizontal tiles on top of each other, which leaves us with  that has  different tilings.

Generating valid tilings
Finding valid tilings of the Aztec diamond involves the solution of the underlying set-covering problem.  Let  be the set of 2X1 dominoes where each domino in D may be placed within the diamond (without crossing its boundaries) when no other dominoes are present. Let  be the set of 1X1 squares lying within the diamond that must be covered.  Two dominoes within D can be found to cover any boundary square within S, and four dominoes within D can be found to cover any non-boundary square within S.

Define  to be the set of dominoes that cover square , and let  be an indicator variable such that  if the  domino is used in the tiling, and 0 otherwise.  With these definitions, the task of tiling the Aztec diamond may be reduced to a constraint satisfaction problem formulated as a binary integer program:

Subject to:
 

The  constraint guarantee that square  will be covered by a single tile, and the collection of  constraints ensures that each square will be covered (no holes in the covering).  This formulation can be solved with standard integer programming packages.  Additional constraints can be constructed to force placement of particular dominoes, ensure a minimum number of horizontal or vertically-oriented dominoes are used, or generate distinct tilings.

An alternative approach is to apply Knuth's Algorithm X to enumerate valid tilings for the problem.

References

External links
 

Enumerative combinatorics